Holmes is an English-language surname with several origins.

The name can be a variant of the surname Holme. This surname has several etymological origins: it can be derived from a name for someone who lived next to a holly tree, from the Middle English holm; it can also be derived from the Old English holm and Old Norse holmr. Another probable origin of Holmes is from a placename near Dundonald, or else a place located in the barony of Inchestuir. The surname is also sometimes an Anglicised form of the Gaelic Mac Thomáis; similarly, Holmes can also be a variant of Cavish, derived as an Anglicised form of Mac Thámhais.

People

A
 Alan Holmes, Welsh musician and record producer
 Albert Holmes (footballer, born 1885) (1885–?), English footballer
 Albert Holmes (footballer born 1942), English-born footballer
 Alex Holmes (born 1981), American football player
 Alexander Holmes, crewman of the ship William Brown, convicted of manslaughter in 1841 for forcing passengers out of an overloaded lifeboat
 Alexander Holmes, pseudonym of Hans Habe
 Alfred Holmes (1931–1994), sergeant of the Gibraltar Regiment
 Alfred Holmes (composer) (1837–1876), violinist and composer
 Alice Waring Holmes (1872 – 1939), dentist and suffragette
 Alvin Holmes (1939–2020), American politician
 Andre Holmes (born 1988), American football player; brother of Jason Holmes (see below)
 Andrew Holmes (disambiguation), multiple people
 Anthony Holmes, British author and businessman
 Anthony D. Holmes (born 1945), Australian plastic and reconstructive surgeon
 J. Anthony Holmes, American diplomat
 Arthur Holmes (1890–1965), British geologist
 Arthur F. Holmes (born 1924), American professor of philosophy
 Ashton Holmes (born 1978), American film and TV actor
 Augusta Holmès (1847–1903), French composer

B
 Barry Holmes (1928–1949), Anglo-Argentinian rugby union player
 Ben Holmes (1890–1943), American film director
 Benjamin Holmes (disambiguation)
 Besby Holmes (1917–2006), American World War II fighter pilot
 Bill Holmes (disambiguation)
 Brad Holmes (born 1979), American football executive
 Bruce Holmes (born 1965), American football player
 Burton Holmes (1870–1958), American traveller, photographer and filmmaker

C
 Catherine Holmes, Australian judge
 Charles Holmes (disambiguation)
 Charlie Holmes (1910–1985), American jazz saxophonist
 Chris Holmes (disambiguation)
 Christian Holmes (born 1997), American football player
 Chuck Holmes (ice hockey) (born 1935), Canadian hockey player
 Clarence Holmes (born 1968), also known as Ready Rock C, American musician
 Clay Holmes (born 1993), American baseball player
 Clent Holmes (born 1917), American guitarist

D
 Daniel Henry Holmes (1816–1898), American businessman
 Danny Holmes (born 1989), English footballer
 Darnay Holmes (born 1998), American football player
 Darren Holmes (baseball) (born 1966), American baseball player and coach
 Dave Holmes (actor) (born 1971), American television personality
 Dave Holmes (sportscaster), American sportscaster
 David Holmes (disambiguation)
 Derek Holmes (born 1978), Scottish footballer
 Derek Holmes (ice hockey) (born 1939), Canadian ice hockey player, coach, and administrator
 Diane Holmes (born 1935), Canadian politician
 Don Holmes (born 1959), Australian rules football player
 Don Holmes (American football) (born 1961), American former National Football League player and college coach
 Donald F. Holmes  (1910–1980), American inventor
 Donald Grahame Holmes, Australian electrical engineer

E
 Eamonn Holmes (born 1959), Northern Irish journalist and broadcaster
 Earl Holmes, American football player
 Edmond Holmes (1850–1936), English writer and poet
 Edward Morell Holmes (1843–1930), British botanist
 Edwin Holmes (disambiguation)
 Elizabeth Holmes, American businesswoman, founder of Theranos
 Emma Holmes, American Civil War diarist
 Eric Holmes (racing driver) (born 1974), American race car driver
 Eric Holmes (video game designer), Scottish writer, creative director and videogame designer
 Eric Leighton Holmes, British chemist
 Ernest Holmes (1887–1960), founder of the movement known as Religious Science, also known as "Science of Mind," a part of the New Thought Movement
 Ernie Holmes (1948–2008), American football player
 Errol Holmes (1905–1960), English cricketer

F
 Frank Holmes (disambiguation)
 Fred Holmes (1878–1956), American baseball player
 Frederic L. Holmes (1932–2003), American historian of science
 Frederick Hale Holmes (1812–1875), British professor of chemistry, pioneer of electric lighting and inventor
 Frederick William Holmes (1889–1969), English soldier awarded the Victoria Cross

G
 Gabriel Holmes (1769–1829), American politician
 Gavrielle Holmes, American politician
 Genta Hawkins Holmes (born 1940), American foreign service officer
 George Holmes (professor) (1927–2009), Chichele Professor of Medieval History Emeritus at the University of Oxford
 George Frederick Holmes (1829–1897), American educator
 George M. Holmes (1929–2009), U.S. politician
 Gordon Morgan Holmes (1876–1965), British neurologist
 Greg Holmes (cricketer) (born 1993), Welsh cricketer
 Greg Holmes (rugby union) (born 1983), Australian rugby union player
 Greg Holmes (tennis) (born 1963), American former tennis player

H
 Hamilton E. Holmes (1941–1995), American physician who helped desegregate the University of Georgia as one of the first two African-American students
 Hap Holmes (1889–1940), Canadian ice hockey goalie
 Harold Holmes (disambiguation)
 Harry Holmes (disambiguation)
 Harvey Holmes (1873–1948), American college football player and coach of football, baseball and track
 Helen Freudenberger Holmes (1915–1997), American journalist, historian, teacher, politician and Women's Army Corps officer
 Helen Holmes (actress) (1893–1950), American actress
 Henry Holmes (disambiguation)
 H. H. Holmes (1861–1896), American con man, killer and bigamist
 Howdy Holmes (born 1949), American racing driver
 Hugh Holmes (1840–1916), Irish politician

I
 Ian Holmes (disambiguation)

J
 J. Anthony Holmes, American diplomat
 Jacob Holmes (born 1983), Australian basketball player
 Jackie Holmes (1920–1995), American Formula One driver
 Jake Holmes (born 1939), American folk-pop singer/songwriter
 Jalyn Holmes (born 1996), American football player
 James Holmes (disambiguation)
 Jason Holmes (born 1989), American Australian rules footballer; brother of Andre Holmes
 Jennifer Holmes (disambiguation), multiple people
 Jerome Holmes (born 1961), American federal judge
 Jessica Holmes (born 1973), Canadian comedian and actor
 Jimmy Holmes (born 1953), Irish former professional footballer
 Joan Holmes (born 1935), founding president of The Hunger Project
 Joe Holmes (born 1963), American heavy metal guitarist
 Joe Holmes (singer) (1906–1978), Irish singer
 Joe Holmes (rugby league), rugby league footballer
 Joel Holmes (1821–1872), English soldier awarded the Victoria Cross
 John Holmes (disambiguation)
 Jon Holmes (born 1973), British comedy writer and broadcaster
 Jonathan Holmes (disambiguation)
 Joseph Holmes (disambiguation)
 Josh Holmes (rugby union) (born 1987), Australian rugby union player
 Josh Holmes (video game designer) (born 1973), Canadian game producer and video game designer
 Julie Lynn Holmes, American former figure skater

K
 Katie Holmes (born 1978), American actress
 Keith Holmes (palaeobotanist) (born 1933), Australian palaeobotanist
 Keith Holmes (boxer) (born 1969), American boxer
 Kelda Holmes (born 1970), English actress
 Kelly Holmes (born 1970), British middle-distance athlete
 Kenneth Holmes (1934–2021), British scientist
 King K. Holmes (born 1937), American physician, medical researcher, and medical school professor
 Kris Holmes (born 1950), American type designer

L
 Larry Holmes (born 1949), American boxer
 La'Shanda Holmes (born 1985), American Coast Guard helicopter pilot
 Lee Holmes (born 1987), English footballer
 Len Holmes, Australian rugby league footballer
 Linda Holmes (born 1959), American politician
 Lindsey Holmes (born 1973), American politician
 Lizzie Holmes (1850–1926), American anarchist and editor 
 Louis Holmes, American football player
 Lucy Holmes (born 1979), British-born Australian TV presenter and performer

M
 Mackenzie Holmes (born c. 2001), American basketball player
 Margaret Holmes (1909–2009), Australian peace activist
 Margaret Holmes (ecumenist) (1886–1981), Australian refugee resettlement officer
 Margaret Flagg Holmes (1886–1976), co-founder of Alpha Kappa Alpha sorority
 Mark Holmes (disambiguation)
 Martha Holmes (photographer) (1923–2006), American photographer
 Martha Holmes (broadcaster), British marine biologist, TV journalist and producer
 Mary Holmes (disambiguation)
 Matt Holmes (actor) (born 1976), Australian actor
 Matthew Holmes (engineer) (1844–1903), chief mechanical engineer of the North British Railway
 Maurice Holmes (cricketer), English cricketer and barrister
 Michael Holmes (disambiguation)
 Michelle Holmes (born 1967), English actress
 Mike Holmes (born 1963), Canadian professional contractor and host of Holmes on Homes
 Mike Holmes (born 1948), British electrical engineer
 Mike Holmes (wide receiver) (born 1950), Canadian Football League receiver

N
 Nancy Holmes (born 1959), Canadian poet and educator
 Nick Holmes (disambiguation)

O
 Obadiah Holmes (1610–1682), early Rhode Island settler and Baptist minister 
 Oliver Holmes (rugby league) (born 1992), Canadian rugby player
 Oliver Wendell Holmes Sr. (1809–1894), poet and essayist
 Oliver Wendell Holmes Jr. (1841–1935), justice of the Supreme Court of the United States
 Oscar Holmes (1916–2001), first African-American Naval Aviator and air traffic controller

P
 Paul Holmes (disambiguation)
 Pehr G. Holmes (1881–1952), US Representative from Massachusetts
 Percy Holmes (1886–1971), English cricketer
 Pete or Peter Holmes (disambiguation)
 Philip Holmes (born 1945), American engineering professor
 Phillips Holmes (1907–1942), American film actor
 Priest Holmes (born 1973), American football player

R
 Ray Holmes (1914–2005), British Second World War fighter pilot
 Rand Holmes, (1942–2002), Canadian comic artist
 Reggie Holmes (born 1987), American basketball player
 Richard Holmes (disambiguation)
 Richaun Holmes (born 1993), American basketball player
 Robert Holmes (disambiguation)
 Ruth Bradley Holmes (1924–2021), American linguist, educator, and polyglot

S
 Samuel Jackson Holmes (1868–1964), American zoologist
 Santonio Holmes (born 1984), American footballer and  Super Bowl XLIII MVP
 Sharon Holmes (1950–2015), Canadian artist nee Sharon Christian
 Simon Hugh Holmes (1831–1919), Nova Scotia politician, publisher and lawyer
 Stanley Holmes, 1st Baron Dovercourt (1878–1961), British politician
 Steve Holmes (actor) (born 1961), Romanian-born German pornographic film actor
 Susan Holmes (disambiguation)

T
 Taylor Holmes (1878–1959), American stage actor
 Terry Holmes (born 1957), former Welsh international rugby union player
 Theophilus H. Holmes (1804–1880), Confederate Civil War lieutenant general
 Thomas Holmes (disambiguation)
 Tim Holmes (artist) (born 1955), American sculptor, filmmaker and musician
 Tim Holmes (actor) (born 1967), American actor
 Timothy Holmes (1825–1907), English surgeon
 Tina Holmes (born 1973), American television and film actress
 Tom Holmes (born 1979), contemporary American artist
 Tom Holmes (born 1930s), current chairman of the far-right British political party the National Front
 Tommy Holmes (1917–2008), American baseball player

V
 Valentine Holmes (born 1995), Australian-born American football player and rugby player
 Valerie Susan Holmes (born 1946), English beauty pageant contestant
 Victoria Holmes, English novelist

W
 William Holmes (Australian general) (1862–1917), Australian Army Major General during World War I
 William Holmes (British general)
 William Edgar Holmes (1895–1918), English soldier and VC recipient
 William Holmes (1779–1851), British politician
 William Holmes (British Army officer) (1892–1969), British general during the Second World War
 William Henry Holmes (1846–1933), American anthropologist, archaeologist, geologist and museum director
 William Henry Holmes (musician) (1812–1885), English musician

Fictional characters
 Enola Holmes (character), sister of Sherlock Holmes created by Nancy Springer
 Mycroft Holmes, brother of Sherlock Holmes
 Sherlock Holmes, fictional detective

References

See also
 Justice Holmes (disambiguation)
 Safiya Henderson-Holmes (1950–2001), African-American poet
 Holmes à Court, a surname
 Derek St. Holmes (born 1953), American musician
 Holm (surname)

English-language surnames
Surnames of Scottish origin
Toponymic surnames